Alireza Savari (born 24 August 2000) is an Iranian footballer who plays as a midfielder who currently plays for Iranian club Foolad in the Persian Gulf Pro League.

Club career

Foolad
He made his debut for Foolad in 16th fixtures of 2018–19 Iran Pro League against Pars Jonoubi Jam.

Honours 
Foolad
Hazfi Cup: 2020–21

Iran U16
 AFC U-16 Championship runner-up: 2016

References

2000 births
Living people
Iranian footballers
Foolad FC players
Association football midfielders
People from Ahvaz
Sportspeople from Khuzestan province